Stanford Bishop is a village and civil parish  north east of Hereford, in the county of Herefordshire, England. In 2011 the parish had a population of 113. The parish touches Acton Beauchamp, Avenbury, Bishop's Frome, Linton and Suckley. Stanford Bishop shares a parish council with Acton Beauchamp and Evesbatch called "Acton Beauchamp Group Parish Council".

Landmarks 
There are 7 listed buildings in Stanford Bishop. Stanford Bishop has a church called St James and a village hall.

History 
The name "Stanford" means 'Stone ford', the bishop part being because it was held by the Bishop of Hereford. Stanford Bishop was recorded in the Domesday Book as Stanford. On 24 March 1884 part of Bishop's Frome was transferred to the parish and Lords Meadow was transferred from Bromyard.

References

External links 

 

Villages in Herefordshire
Civil parishes in Herefordshire